Munster Rugby players include players who have earned significant accolades in club play with Munster Rugby or in international play.

British & Irish Lions
The following Munster players have also represented the British & Irish Lions:

The '200' Club
Players who have reached the 200 caps mark for Munster.

 Anthony Foley (1994–2008): 201
 Alan Quinlan (1996–2011): 212
 Peter Stringer (1998–2013): 232
 Ronan O'Gara (1997–2013): 240
 John Hayes (1998–2011): 217
 David Wallace (1997–2012): 203
 Marcus Horan (1999–2013): 225
 Mick O'Driscoll (1998–2003, 2005–12) 207
 Donncha O'Callaghan (1998–2015): 268
 Billy Holland (2007–2021): 247
 Stephen Archer (2009-Present): 238

Overseas players
Note: Flags indicate national union as has been defined under WR eligibility rules. Players may hold more than one non-WR nationality.
 
  Rhys Ellison: 1997–99
  John Langford: 1999–2001
  Jim Williams: 2001–05
  Dominic Malone: 2002
  Simon Kerr: 2004–05
  Andy Long: 2003
  Jason Jones-Hughes: 2003–04
  David Pusey: 2003–05
  Gordon McIlwham: 2003–05
  Christian Cullen: 2003–07
  Tom Bowman: 2004–05
  Gary Connolly: 2005–06
  Anton Pitout: 2005–06
  Trevor Halstead: 2005–07
  Federico Pucciariello: 2005–09
  Diogo Mateus: 2006
  Chris Wyatt: 2006–07
  Lifeimi Mafi: 2006–12
  Rua Tipoki: 2007–09
  Paul Warwick: 2007–11
  Doug Howlett: 2008–13
  Nick Williams: 2008–10
  Jean de Villiers: 2009–10
  Julien Brugnaut: 2009–10
  Toby Morland: 2009–10
  Wian du Preez: 2009–13
  Sam Tuitupou: 2010–11
  Peter Borlase: 2010-12
  BJ Botha: 2011–16
  Will Chambers 2011–12
  Savenaca Tokula: 2012
  Casey Laulala: 2012–14
  CJ Stander: 2012–21
  Gerhard van den Heever: 2013–16
  Quentin MacDonald: 2014 (loan)
  Andrew Smith: 2014–15
  Tyler Bleyendaal: 2014–20
  Eusebio Guiñazú: 2014–15
  Pat Howard: 2014–15
  Francis Saili: 2015–17
  Mark Chisholm: 2015–17
  Lucas González Amorosino: 2015–16
  Mario Sagario: 2015–16
  Rhys Marshall: 2016–21
  Jean Kleyn: 2016–Present
  Jaco Taute: 2016–19
  Thomas du Toit: 2016–17
  Te Aihe Toma: 2016–17
  Gerbrandt Grobler: 2017–18
  Chris Cloete: 2017–Present
  Arno Botha: 2018–20
  Alby Mathewson: 2018–19
  Jed Holloway: 2019
  Keynan Knox: 2019–Present
  RG Snyman: 2020–Present
  Damian de Allende: 2020–Present
  Roman Salanoa: 2020–Present
  Jason Jenkins: 2021–Present
  Declan Moore: 2021–22

Individual records
(correct as of 31 October 2015)

All-time
Most appearances: (263)  Donncha O'Callaghan
Most points: (2,571)  Ronan O'Gara
Most tries: (64)  Simon Zebo
Most cons & pens: (924)  Ronan O'Gara

Heineken Cup
Most appearances: (110)  Ronan O'Gara
Most points: (1,365)  Ronan O'Gara
Most tries: (25)  Simon Zebo
Most cons & pens: (488)  Ronan O'Gara

Pro14
Most appearances: (156)  Donncha O'Callaghan
Most points: (940)  Ronan O'Gara
Most tries: (26)  Simon Zebo
Most cons & pens: (349)  Ronan O'Gara

Bold indicates highest overall record.

ERC Elite Awards
Team Award (50 Heineken Cup matches):  Munster Rugby (187)

ERC Player Awards
100 caps:  Ronan O'Gara (110),  John Hayes (101)
50 caps:  Ronan O'Gara (110),  John Hayes (101),  Donncha O'Callaghan (97),  Peter Stringer (90),  David Wallace (86),  Anthony Foley (85),  Marcus Horan (84), Paul O'Connell (82),  Alan Quinlan (78),  Keith Earls (74),  John Kelly (67),  Conor Murray (65),  Mick O'Driscoll (62),  Peter O'Mahony (61),  Shaun Payne (55),  Anthony Horgan (56),  Frankie Sheahan (55),  Dave Kilcoyne (54),  CJ Stander (50)
500 Heineken Cup points:  Ronan O'Gara (1,365)

World Rugby Hall of Fame
The World Rugby Hall of Fame (formerly the IRB Hall of Fame) recognises special achievement and contribution to the sport of rugby union

 Ronan O'Gara (2018)

ERC15 European Player Award
An award to recognise the best European player in the Heineken Cup from 1995–2010.

 Ronan O'Gara

ERC European Dream Team
The following Munster players were selected in the ERC European Dream Team, an all–time dream team of Heineken Cup players.

 Ronan O'Gara (Fly-half), 1997–2013
 David Wallace (Flanker), 1997–2012
 Anthony Foley (Number 8), 1995–2008

Pro14 Team of the Year
2007–08:  Lifeimi Mafi
2008–09:  Lifeimi Mafi,  Ronan O'Gara,  Jerry Flannery,  Paul O'Connell
2009–10:  Tomás O'Leary
2010–11:  Ronan O'Gara
2011–12:  BJ Botha
2013–14:  Dave Kilcoyne,  Casey Laulala
2014–15:  CJ Stander,  Tommy O'Donnell
2015–16:  CJ Stander
2016–17:  CJ Stander,  Jaco Taute,  Rory Scannell,  Billy Holland,  John Ryan,  Dave Kilcoyne,  Tyler Bleyendaal
2017–18:  Rory Scannell
2018–19:  Peter O'Mahony,  Tadhg Beirne
2020-21:  Kevin O'Byrne,  Billy Holland,  Damian de Allende

Pro14 Golden Boot
The Golden Boot is awarded to the kicker who has successfully converted the highest percentage of place kicks during the 22-week regular Pro14 season. The prize has been awarded annually since 2012.
(Percentage success rate in brackets)
 2013–14  JJ Hanrahan (88.71%)
 2019–20  JJ Hanrahan (87.30%)

References

 
Munster